The 1979 Wells Fargo Open was a women's tennis tournament played on indoor hard courts at the San Diego Sports Arena in San Diego, California in the United States that was part of the Colgate Series of the 1979 WTA Tour. It was the second edition of the tournament and was held from July 30 through August 5, 1979. First-seeded Tracy Austin won the singles title and earned $14,000 first-prize money.

Finals

Singles
 Tracy Austin defeated  Martina Navratilova 6–4, 6–2
 It was Austin's 4th singles title of the year and the 7th of her career.

Doubles
 Rosie Casals /  Martina Navratilova defeated  Ann Kiyomura /  Betty-Ann Stuart 3–6, 6–4, 6–2

Prize money

References

External links
 ITF tournament edition details
 Tournmanent draws

Wells Fargo Open
Southern California Open
Wells Fargo Open
Wells Fargo Open